Little Rapids may refer to:

Little Rapids, Newfoundland and Labrador
Little Rapids, Ontario
Little Rapids, Wisconsin